Sunset Theater is a historic movie theater located at Asheboro, Randolph County, North Carolina. It was designed by the architectural firm of Benton & Benton and built in 1929.  It is a two-story, parapet roof load-bearing stuccoed brick building in the Spanish Colonial Revival style.  It measures approximately 50 feet by 100 feet and has a large open auditorium seating 412.  The theater was purchased by the City of Asheboro in 2005.

It was added to the National Register of Historic Places in 2011.

References

External links
Sunset Theater website
Cinema Treasures website entry

Theatres on the National Register of Historic Places in North Carolina
Mission Revival architecture in North Carolina
Theatres completed in 1929
Buildings and structures in Randolph County, North Carolina
National Register of Historic Places in Randolph County, North Carolina